Ida Soule Kuhn (born Ida Soule Howes; 1869–November 19, 1952) was a social and political activist from Hoquiam, Washington. Kuhn was an honorary member of and occupied managerial positions in a number of famous American social organizations. An activist and speaker, she publicly expressed her pro-American political beliefs during World Wars I and II.

Kuhn was an active member of the Daughters of the American Revolution (DAR). She occupied every position existent within the organization and, in 1903, founded the first DAR chapter in southwestern Washington, in Hoquiam. It was named the Robert Gray Chapter. Kuhn was a nominee for the position of DAR Washington State Regent several times, and was elected for a one-year term in 1908. She co-founded the Washington State Chapter of the Mayflower Society as its charter member and historian. She was a co-founder of the Grays Harbor Chapter of the American Association of University Women.

During World War I, Kuhn travelled extensively around Europe and Asia, observing as different countries prepared for war. She presented her political views as the speaker at DAR assemblies during both World Wars, emphasizing the necessity to fight any kind of propaganda, such as pro-German or anti-American.

Early life, family and education

Ida Kuhn was born in Illinois in 1869. She was the daughter of Frances Fensley and Joseph Soule, a shipbuilder from Freeport, Maine. She had several siblings: John Fensley Soule, who was a secretary of the Northwestern Lumber Company; Sarah Soule McMillan; Captain Thomas Soule; and Josiah Onslow Stearns.

The Soule family's ancestry on both sides was wide. It could be traced back to Childeric I, King of the Franks, and included many other historical figures, such as Philip Schuyler, a General in the Revolutionary War; Timothy Pickering, the third United States Secretary of State; John Wheelwright, English clergyman; and others.

Kuhn graduated from the New York Normal School in Oneonta, New York and she received Bachelor of Science and Master of Science degrees from the University of Washington.

Career

Daughters of the American Revolution

On March 7, 1903, Kuhn became the founder or Organizing Regent of the Robert Gray Chapter of Daughters of the American Revolution organization in Hoquiam, Washington. The sixth chapter in the state, it was the first chapter founded in the southwest Washington State. The chapter began with twelve members, including Kuhn and two of her sisters.

Over the years, Kuhn worked at every position available in the DAR. In 1907, she was the state assembly treasurer, and was nominated for the position of DAR Washington State Regent. She won at the state assembly; however, at the national assembly, the votes were divided equally between her and another nominee. Due to the tie, the previous regent stayed in the position for one more year. The following year, Kuhn was nominated again, and this time was elected to the position, serving one year.

Washington State Society of Mayflower Descendants

By 1912, Kuhn became a co-founder, charter member, and historian for the Mayflower Society Washington State chapter. All the founders of the Robert Gray Chapter were eligible to belong to the new society, and Kuhn, as well as other DAR members, was already a member of the Mayflower Society branch in Washington, D.C. In later years, Kuhn and her brother Thomas, who was also a member, were known as honor members of the Society.

Career pause and post-travel activity

Kuhn left her positions in 1912 to travel the world, returning to the U.S. in 1916. She resumed her work for the Daughters of the American Revolution, being active in both social and political endeavors. In 1918, as a DAR assembly speaker, she emphasized the need to "purge all schools of pro-German and anti-American teachers." In 1935, with World War II approaching, Kuhn actively stood by her anti-propaganda beliefs and lobbied the question of national defense against "foreign-bred, hydra-headed subversive propaganda" at the DAR convention.

In later years, Kuhn remained an active member of the DAR and was commonly referred to as the honorary Washington State Regent.

Other memberships and positions

Besides her memberships in the DAR and the Mayflower Society, Kuhn was a member of the Order of Americans of Armorial Descent, Americans of Royals Descent, and the Hoquiam Business and Professional Women's Club. She was founder and president of the Grays Harbor Branch of the American Association of University Women.

Personal life and death

In 1900, Ida Soule Howes married Albert Henry Kuhn, Washington state pioneer and lumberman. They had a son in 1939.

In July 1912, Kuhn left Hoquiam, Washington with her husband to travel the world. They were in Europe as World War I began, and were forced to come back to the U.S. After a short time in America, they left again to visit Japan, China and India. They came back to America in 1916, sharing their travel experiences and observations of every country they had visited being "more or less in a state of preparation for national defense."

In 1917, Kuhn with her husband spent some time in California, and from there went to attend the inauguration of President Wilson.

Kuhn died on November 19, 1952, in Hoquiam, Washington, and was buried in the Sunset Memorial Park.

See also 

 Daughters of the American Revolution 
 Mayflower Society

References

Literature cited 

People from Hoquiam, Washington
Daughters of the American Revolution people
American Association of University Women
University of Washington alumni
1869 births
1952 deaths